Aleksandr Mrinsky (born 9 August 1990) is a Belarusian footballer who plays for Kolos Cherven.

External links
 
 
 Profile at Belshina website

1990 births
Living people
Belarusian footballers
Association football forwards
Belarusian expatriate footballers
Expatriate footballers in Slovakia
Belarusian expatriate sportspeople in Slovakia
2. Liga (Slovakia) players
Belarusian Premier League players
FC Belshina Bobruisk players
FC Dinamo Minsk players
FC Bereza-2010 players
FC Vitebsk players
FC Lokomotíva Košice players
FC Uzda players
FC Volna Pinsk players
FC Osipovichi players